Leah Kagasa, is a model and beauty pageant contestant who was crowned Miss Uganda 2016 at the age of 21 years. She reigned for 2 years as Miss Uganda from 2016 to 2018. She represented Uganda in Miss World 2016 in Washington, DC, that December.
Currently she is involved in the Miss Uganda Foundation charity organization as an advocate for social issues like sanitation, teenage pregnancies and girl child education.

Background
Kagasa was born in 1995, to Ugandan parents in Kabarole District. She attended St. Helen’s Primary School, before transferring to Bweranyangi Girls' Senior Secondary School for O-Level studies. She completed her A-Level education at Maryhill High School.

She graduated from Makerere University Business School with a Bachelor's degree in Marketing. She also holds a Cabin Crew Diploma, awarded by the Uganda Aviation School, where she attended on scholarship, provided by Flight Captain Mike Mukula, the aviation school's proprietor.

2016 Miss Uganda pageant
During the 2016 Miss Uganda competition, Kagasa beat about 20 other contestants to win the crown. She was crowned by Zahara Nakiyaga, the 2015 Miss Uganda. In 2017, there was no Miss Uganda contest and Kagasa continued as Miss Uganda until the 2018 Miss Uganda contest in August 2018. Besides winning the beauty pageant, Kagasa was also voted "Miss Popularity".

During the two years that she served as Miss Uganda, she has participated in several community development projects, including a clean water campaign with UNAA Causes, an American-Ugandan non-profit based in the United States. Other campaigns have include the "Kick Malaria out of Uganda" with the Uganda Ministry of Health, and others.

Miss World 2016
Leah Kagasa represented Uganda at the Miss World 2016, in Washington DC, United States of America.

See also
Miss Uganda
Quiin Abenakyo
Dora Mwima

References

External links
Leah Kagasa crowned Miss Uganda 2016/17 As of 16 October 2016.
Miss Uganda 2010-2017: What They’re Doing Now As of 6 July 2017.
Meet All The Former Miss Uganda Winners Since 1967 As of 14 October 2016.

1995 births
Living people
Toro people
Miss World 2016 delegates
Ugandan beauty pageant winners
People from Kabarole District
People from Western Region, Uganda
Makerere University Business School alumni
People educated at Maryhill High School
People educated at Bweranyangi Girls' Senior Secondary School